Esteban Toledo (born 10 September 1962) is a Mexican professional golfer, who was a member of the PGA Tour in 1994 and 1998–2004 and has also spent many years playing on the second tier Nationwide Tour (now known as Korn Ferry Tour). At present, he competes on the PGA Tour Champions.

Toledo was born in Mexicali, Mexico. Before taking up professional golf, Toledo was a boxer.

His sole victory on the Nationwide Tour came at the 2005 Lake Erie Charity Classic at Peek 'n Peak Resort. He also won the 2000 Mexican Open. He represented Mexico in the World Cup in 1992, 1994, 1995, 1998, 2002 and 2006.

In May 2013, Toledo became the first Mexican to win on the Champions Tour, winning the Insperity Championship in a playoff. Toledo has since won an additional three times on the Champions Tour at the 2013 Montreal Championship, 2015 Nature Valley First Tee Open at Pebble Beach and 2016 Allianz Championship.

Toledo's life and career is the subject of the book Tin Cup Dreams by Michael D'Antonio.

Professional wins (6)

Nationwide Tour wins (1)

Nationwide Tour playoff record (0–1)

Other wins (1)
2000 Mexican Open

PGA Tour Champions wins (4)

PGA Tour Champions playoff record (3–0)

Results in major championships

Note: Toledo never played in the Masters Tournament or the PGA Championship.

CUT = missed the half-way cut
"T" = tied

Team appearances
World Cup (representing Mexico): 1992, 1994, 1995, 1998, 2002, 2006

See also
1993 PGA Tour Qualifying School graduates
1997 PGA Tour Qualifying School graduates

References

Further reading

External links

Mexican male golfers
PGA Tour golfers
PGA Tour Champions golfers
Golfers from Colorado
Sportspeople from Mexicali
People from Douglas County, Colorado
1962 births
Living people
20th-century Mexican people